The monarchy of Greece or Greek monarchy was the government in which a hereditary monarch was the sovereign of the Kingdom of Greece from 1832 to 1924 and 1935 to 1973.

History
The monarchy of Greece was created by the London Conference of 1832 at which the First Hellenic Republic was abolished. The Greek crown was originally offered to Prince Leopold of Saxe-Coburg and Gotha but he declined, later being elected the king of the Belgians.

In 1832, Prince Otto of Bavaria of the House of Wittelsbach was styled "His Majesty Otto I, King of Greece", over which he reigned for 30 years until he was deposed in 1862. After Otto's deposition as king, the crown was offered to, amongst others, the novelist and former British colonial secretary Edward Bulwer-Lytton.

A head of state referendum was held in 1862 to name a new king. Most of the Greek people wanted Prince Alfred, Duke of Edinburgh, to be the new king. He won the referendum by 230,016 against the Duke of Leuchtenberg. Alfred declined to be king, and so did every candidate until Prince Vilhelm of Denmark of the House of Glücksburg, who had received six votes. Vilhelm was elected unanimously by the Greek Assembly, and became "His Majesty George I, King of the Hellenes".

There was a referendum in 1920 to restore Constantine I as monarch, but four years later the Second Hellenic Republic was established and the monarchy was abolished following a referendum in 1924. Then in 1935 the monarchy was restored after a referendum and maintained after a referendum in 1946.

In July 1973 the Greek military junta called a referendum, which abolished the monarchy for the second time in Greek history. Then in 1974, the democratically elected prime minister, Konstantinos Karamanlis, called a referendum which legitimately confirmed the abolition.

Residences
Tatoi was the private residence and 10,000-acre estate outside of Athens originally bought by King George I in the 1870s. The property was seized by the Republic following the 1974 referendum and has long been a contentious issue between the former royal family and the Greek state.

The Old Royal Palace is the first royal palace of modern Greece, completed in 1843. It has housed the Hellenic Parliament since 1934. The Old Palace is situated at the heart of modern Athens, facing onto Syntagma Square.

Kings of Greece

Royal consorts

Regents of Greece

Insignia

See also

Basileus
Greek crown jewels
Greek royal family
List of heads of state of Greece
List of heirs to the Greek throne

References

External links

Political history of Greece
1832 establishments in Greece
1973 disestablishments in Greece